Thorigny-sur-Marne (literally Thorigny on Marne) is a commune in the Seine-et-Marne department in the Île-de-France region in north-central France.

Demographics
Inhabitants of Thorigny-sur-Marne are called Thorigniens.

Education
 the three preschools have 376 students, and the three elementary schools have 640 students. The preschools are: Ecole Maternellle Les Cerisiers, Ecole Maternelle Clémenceau, and Ecole Maternelle Les Pointes. The elementary schools are Ecole Elémentaire Les Cerisiers, Ecole Elémentaire Gambetta, and Ecole Elémentaire Les Pointes. The commune has one junior high school, Collège du Moulin à vent, and a vocational high school, Lycée Auguste Perdonnet. The area general senior high school/sixth form college, Lycée Van Dongen, is in Lagny-sur-Marne.

See also
Communes of the Seine-et-Marne department

References

External links

Official site 
1999 Land Use, from IAURIF (Institute for Urban Planning and Development of the Paris-Île-de-France région 

Communes of Seine-et-Marne